Ferula mikraskythiana is a species of flowering plant in the family Apiaceae. It is native to Dobrogea in Romania.

References

mikraskythiana
Plants described in 2017
Flora of Romania